Nicole Ari Parker Kodjoe (born October 7, 1970) is an American actress and model. She made her screen debut with a leading role in the critically acclaimed independent film The Incredibly True Adventure of Two Girls in Love (1995) and went on to appear in Boogie Nights (1997), directed by Paul Thomas Anderson.

Parker has starred in a number of movies, including Blue Streak (1999), Remember the Titans (2000), Brown Sugar (2002), Welcome Home Roscoe Jenkins (2008), Black Dynamite (2009), and Almost Christmas (2016). On television, Parker played the leading role of attorney Teri Joseph (later Carter) in the Showtime drama series Soul Food (2000–04), for which she received five NAACP Image Award for Outstanding Actress in a Drama Series nominations. She also starred in the short-lived UPN romantic comedy Second Time Around (2004–05) and the ABC drama Time After Time (2017). In 2017, she joined the cast of Fox's prime-time soap opera Empire playing Giselle Barker. She formerly appeared as a recurring character in Chicago P.D. as Deputy Superintendent Samantha Miller and in And Just Like That... as Lisa Todd Wexley.

Early years

Parker was born on October 7, 1970, in Baltimore, Maryland. She is the only child of her divorced parents, health care professional Susan Parker and dentist Donald Parker. After briefly attending a Montessori school, Parker entered Roland Park Country School, where she stayed through high school. At the age of 17, she won Best Actress in the state of Maryland's high school theater competition. She became a member of The Washington Ballet Company before earning an acting degree in 1993 from New York University's Tisch School of the Arts.

Career
Parker made her screen debut playing secondary role in the 1993 made-for-television movie Other Women's Children starring Melanie Mayron. Two years later she went to star in the critically acclaimed independent comedy-drama film, The Incredibly True Adventure of Two Girls in Love. Also that year, she starred in the Divas, a made-for-television musical drama film about female singing group. In 1997, she starred in the comedy-drama film Boogie Nights written and directed by Paul Thomas Anderson. The following year, she appeared in the television film Exiled: A Law & Order Movie. Her other film credits include The End of Violence (1997), Spark (1998), the 1999 Sundance Film Festival winner The Adventures of Sebastian Cole (1998), 200 Cigarettes (1999), Loving Jezebel (1999), A Map of the World (1999) and Blue Streak (1999).

In 2000, Parker played the leading role in the drama film Dancing in September and starred opposite Denzel Washington in the biographical film Remember the Titans, receiving NAACP Image Award for Outstanding Supporting Actress in a Motion Picture nomination. Also that year, she began starring as Teri Joseph in the Showtime drama series, Soul Food. The series was an adaptation of George Tillman's 1997 drama film, Soul Food, and the role of Teri played Vanessa Williams. The series ended in 2004. For her performance she received five NAACP Image Award for Outstanding Actress in a Drama Series nominations. She returned to film, starring in the 2002 romantic comedy Brown Sugar. She later appeared in King's Ransom (2005), Welcome Home Roscoe Jenkins (2008) alongside her Blue Streak co-star Martin Lawrence, Black Dynamite (2009), Imagine That (2009), and Pastor Brown (2009).

On television, Parker starred on the short-lived UPN sitcom, Second Time Around from 2004 to 2005. In 2010, she returned to television with starring role in the ABC legal drama, The Deep End, the series was cancelled after one season. In 2012. she made her Broadway debut playing the role of Blanche DuBois in A Streetcar Named Desire. In 2013, Parker was lead actress in the NBC drama pilot Secret Lives of Husbands and Wives, and later had a recurring role on Revolution. In 2014, she starred as a series regular in the first season of the TNT crime drama Murder in the First, opposite Taye Diggs and Kathleen Robertson. In 2016, she appeared alongside Kimberly Elise and Mo'Nique in the comedy-drama film Almost Christmas. In 2017, she starred in the another short-lived drama series, Time After Time.

In 2017, Parker joined the cast of Fox prime time soap opera, Empire, playing Giselle Barker in a recurring role during the fourth season. She was promoted to a series regular for the fifth season, starring to series finale in 2020. For the 2020-21 television season, Parker had a recurring role on the NBC series, Chicago P.D, and in late 2021 began starring in the HBO Max comedy-drama series, And Just Like That... playing the role of Lisa Todd Wexley.

Personal life
Parker is an active member of the Democratic Party. She eloped with actor Joseph Falasca in March 2001. Their marriage, which lasted several months, ended in divorce later that year. Parker married her Soul Food co-star Boris Kodjoe in Gundelfingen, Germany, on May 21, 2005. She gave birth to their first child, Sophie, on March 5, 2005. Sophie has spina bifida, which was diagnosed at birth. Parker gave birth to their son Nicolas in October 2006 in Atlanta, Georgia. The family attends the Cascade United Methodist Church when in Atlanta.

Filmography

Film

Television

References

External links

Nicole Ari Parker on Twitter

1970 births
20th-century American actresses
21st-century American actresses
Actresses from Baltimore
African-American actresses
African-American Methodists
American film actresses
American television actresses
Circle in the Square Theatre School alumni
Living people
Tisch School of the Arts alumni